The women's long jump at the 2017 Asian Athletics Championships was held on July 6 in India.

Results

References
Results

Long
Long jump at the Asian Athletics Championships